John Robert Kenyon (13 January 1807 – 17 April 1880) was a British lawyer and academic. A Fellow of All Souls College, Oxford, from 1828, he served as Vinerian Professor of English Law at the University of Oxford from 1844 until his death.

Biography
He was born the first son of Thomas Kenyon (the son of Lloyd Kenyon, 1st Baron Kenyon) and Louisa Charlotte Lloyd of Pradoe, Shropshire. He attended Charterhouse School (1819) and then matriculated at Christ Church, Oxford, on 24 January 1825, aged 18. He was awarded his Bachelor of Arts (BA) degree in 1828, and in the same year was elected a Fellow of All Souls College, Oxford. He gained a Bachelor of Civil Law (BCL) degree in 1831 and Doctor of Civil Law (DCL) degree in 1836. He was called to the bar at the Middle Temple in 1835, and became a bencher in 1862. In 1844 he succeeded Philip Williams as Vinerian Professor of English Law, and held the chair until his death. He was also Recorder of Oswestry. He died on 17 April 1880 in Pradoe, the place of his birth.

John Robert Kenyon was the father of Sir Frederic Kenyon and the grandfather of Dame Kathleen Kenyon.

Sources

 Foster, Joseph, "Alumni Oxonienses"
 Hanbury, H.G., 1958. "Vinerian Professors and Legal Education." Oxford: OUP.

1807 births
1880 deaths
Lawyers from Shropshire
People educated at Charterhouse School
Fellows of All Souls College, Oxford
Alumni of Christ Church, Oxford
Members of the Middle Temple
English legal scholars
Vinerian Professors of English Law